Dongshankou is an area in the Yuexiu District of Guangzhou, Guangdong province, People's Republic of China. The name "Dongshan" can trace back to Ming dynasty (14th–17th century). A eunuch named Wei Juan, who was an officer in Guangzhou in years of Chenghua of Ming dynasty, built a temple on a small hill in the east side of Guangzhou city to boast himself. Guangzhou people at that time often called the main small hill as "Shan" and called the hummocks around it as "Gang", so they named the temple "Dongshan Temple". After that, the surrounding area is called Dongshan.

History 
According to the historic record, Dongshankou was the suburb area of Guangzhou city before Qing dynasty. With poor development and utilization, this wooded area was called "Jindongjiao", which means the Near Eastern suburbs. In the late Qing dynasty, as the modern industry began to grow up, Dongshankou met the unprecedented development opportunity. During the same period, the construction of Guangdong–Hankou Railway and Kowloon–Canton Railway promoted a rapid population growth in Guangzhou city. Therefore, Dongshankou became a hotspot of the development of public buildings and residential area. Under the Treaty of Wanghia, the Southern Baptist Convention bought lands on Miao Qian Xi Road, Xu Gu Yuan Road, Pei Zheng Road and Si Bei Tong Jin Street in Dongshankou and erected churches, schools and hospitals there. After World War I, some Overseas Chinese came back to Guangzhou and became the main force of Dongshankou development.
Dongshankou had belong to Dongshan District before the district merged with Yuexiu District in 2005.

Landmarks 
 Tung Shan Christian Church
Tung Shan Christian Church, formerly Tung Shan Baptist Church, was built in 1909 by the Southern Baptist Convention.

 The Museum of Site of The Third National Congress of the Communist Party of China
 Dongshan historical mansions
Most of the historical mansions and villas in Dongshankou are listed as important protection units of cultural relic. These historical mansions, combined with Chinese and Western styles, show the special and multicultural history of Guangzhou City. Kui Yuan, Chun Yuan, Jian Yuan, Ming Yuan and Yu Yuan are prime examples.

 Guangzhou Dongshan Lake Park
 Guangzhou Yuexiu Library

Dongshankou today 
People also come to Dongshankou to visit historical mansions, many of which have been renovated into upscale bars, cafés, restaurants, clubs and galleries. Besides, the film Hell Lover was shot in Dongshankou in 2016.

See also 
 Dongshankou Station
 Dongshan District, Guangzhou

References

External links 
 你可曾知道，百年前的东山口原来是这般模样

Yuexiu District